Perkins LLC (also known as Perkins Restaurant & Bakery on the locations' signage) is an American casual dining restaurant chain that serves breakfast and other homestyle meals throughout the day in addition to bakery items such as pies, muffins and other sweets.

History

1957−84
The Perkins chain was established in 1957, when Matt and Ivan Perkins opened what was called Smithies Pancake House in Cincinnati, Ohio. In 1958, the chain expanded as a franchise. One franchisee in Minnesota, Wyman Nelson, introduced an expanded menu and an aggressive advertising campaign in 1967.

From 1969 to 1978, Nelson consolidated Perkins and another chain, Smitty's, into Perkins 'Cake & Steak'. From headquarters in Edina, Minnesota, he assumed nationwide development control of the company, and focused on opening over 220 restaurants. In 1979, Matt and Ivan retired, selling their remaining interest in the company, including trademark and distribution rights. In August 1979, Perkins became a wholly owned subsidiary of Memphis-based Holiday Inns, Inc., and corporate headquarters were established in Memphis,Tennessee.

1985−99
In 1985, restaurant entrepreneur Donald N. Smith, who then served on the Board of Directors of Holiday Inns, purchased an ownership interest in Perkins, becoming Chairman of the Board and the company's CEO.

The company was renamed Perkins Family Restaurants in 1987 and was organized into a master limited partnership with interests publicly traded on the New York Stock Exchange. The corporation expanded into Canada, opening a restaurant in Thunder Bay, Ontario. In 1990, the company began its philanthropic relationship with Give Kids the World, contributing money and meals to the Florida-based charity for terminally ill children globally.

Matt Perkins died of heart disease in 1991 at age 79,  and Ivan Perkins died on February 11, 1998.  At the time of Ivan's death, the franchise had 462 restaurants in 32 states.

2000−present
In the 2000s, Perkins underwent business changes. In 2000, it merged with a wholly owned subsidiary of The Restaurant Company (TRC). In 2005, TRC was acquired by Castle Harlan, a New York-based private equity investment firm, for approximately US$245 million. In May 2006, the parent company acquired Marie Callender's, a chain of casual dining restaurants also known for their freshly baked pies, and combined it with the Perkins chain, forming Perkins & Marie Callender's Inc.

In June 2011, many restaurants were closed with no notice given to customers or staff. Closures occurred in Colorado, Kansas, Illinois, Tennessee, Florida, Michigan, and Minnesota.  Later that month, Perkins & Marie Callender's Inc. filed for Chapter 11 bankruptcy. PMCI closed 65 restaurants and laid off 2,500 workers. In the bankruptcy proceedings PMCI listed assets of $290 million and liabilities of $441 million. PMCI emerged from bankruptcy at the end of November 2011 under the control of Wayzata Investment Partners, but continued to experience difficulties. In May 2012, it was announced that all western New York Perkins restaurants, except for its Olean, New York, location, would close.

On August 5, 2019, its parent company Perkins & Marie Callender's filed for bankruptcy while announcing the closure of 29 of their under-performing restaurants. The following month, several of its locations in northern Pennsylvania closed.

On September 12, 2019, it was announced that ASCENT Hospitality Management of Buford, Georgia, will acquire all remaining Perkins restaurants, a total of 342 units.

See also
 List of pancake houses

References

External links
 

Companies based in Memphis, Tennessee
Restaurant franchises
Bakery cafés
Restaurant chains in the United States
Fast-food chains of the United States
Pancake houses
Restaurants established in 1957
1957 establishments in Ohio
Companies that filed for Chapter 11 bankruptcy in 2011
Companies that filed for Chapter 11 bankruptcy in 2019
2000 mergers and acquisitions
2019 mergers and acquisitions
American companies established in 1957